Peter Hochkofler (born 4 October 1994) is an Italian professional ice hockey player currently playing for EC Red Bull Salzburg in the ICE Hockey League (ICEHL) and the Italian national team.

He represented Italy at the 2019 IIHF World Championship.

References

External links

1994 births
Living people
EC Red Bull Salzburg players
Italian expatriate ice hockey people
Italian expatriate sportspeople in Austria
Italian ice hockey forwards
Ice hockey people from Bolzano
Germanophone Italian people